Li Yinzhu (simplified Chinese: 李茵珠; born 14 September 1949) is a Singaporean actress. She has been in the entertainment industry since 1969 and has filmed more than 150 drama serials.

Career 
In 1980, Li signed with Singapore Broadcasting Corporation to be its first batch of actors. After contracting dengue fever in 2019 and subsequent health issues, she left Mediacorp in 2010 but continued to act on contract basis.

Personal life 
Li was born in Fujian, China. She left China with her mother and two elder brothers when she was young.

Li has 2 daughters.

Filmography

Film

Musical

Accolades

References 

Singaporean people of Chinese descent
Singaporean television personalities
Singaporean television actresses
Living people
1949 births
21st-century Singaporean actresses
20th-century Singaporean actresses